Gloria Church or Our Lady of Glory Church (Portuguese: Nossa Senhora de Gloria) is built in 1911-13 on one of the oldest Roman Catholic church sites in Mumbai; its predecessor was built by the Portuguese Franciscans in 1632. The church is situated in Byculla, Mumbai. In 2019, the restoration project for the church received the Award of Merit under the UNESCO Asia-Pacific Awards for Cultural Heritage Conservation.

History
The original Gloria Church, Nossa Senhora da Glória, was built in 1632 at the foot of the Mazagaon hill. This Franciscan church was funded by the De Souza e Lima family, who owned the Mazagaon island which they procured from the King of Portugal in 1572. The old church was demolished in 1911 and the present one, built at Byculla, was opened in 1913.

Architecture
The modern Gloria church was built in English Gothic Revival style. The crowning achievement in church-building was the erection of Nossa Senhora da Gloria at Byculla (1912), an imposing structure in English Gothic style.

Popular culture
The church’s beauty has inspired many filmmakers to shoot their films on its premises. Prominent among them was Manmohan Desai’s Amar Akbar Anthony, released in 1977.

References 

Roman Catholic churches in Mumbai
Roman Catholic churches completed in 1911
20th-century Roman Catholic church buildings in India
Religious organizations established in the 1630s
1632 establishments in Portuguese India
UNESCO Asia-Pacific Heritage Awards winners